Phytometra silona is a species of moth of the family Erebidae described by William Schaus and W. G. Clements in 1893. It is found in Sierra Leone and in South Africa.

References

Boletobiinae
Moths of Africa